Jordan Maynor is an American politician and a Republican member of the West Virginia House of Delegates representing District 28 since August 24, 2021.

Education 
Maynor graduated from Mountain State University.

References 

Living people
Mountain State University alumni
Republican Party members of the West Virginia House of Delegates
21st-century American politicians
Year of birth missing (living people)